Rodolfo Vieira Srour (born September 25, 1989 in Rio de Janeiro) is a Brazilian submission grappler, mixed martial artist and Brazilian Jiu Jitsu (BJJ) practitioner. 

A four-time Brazilian Jiu Jitsu World Champion, seven-time Abu Dhabi World Pro champion, two-time Pan American and European Champion as well as ADCC Submission Grappling World Champion, Vieira is regarded as one of the best heavyweight BJJ competitors of his generation. His sister is 4 x BJJ World champion Ana Carolina Vieira.

Having transitioned to MMA in 2015, Vieira joined the Ultimate Fighting Championship in 2019 where he competes in the middleweight division.

Background
Born in Rio de Janeiro, Vieira started training under Arlans Maia when he was 13. A few years later as a purple belt he joined  team (now Grappling Fight Team) under Julio Cesar Pereira.

Grappling career
Vieira won the 2009 Abu Dhabi World Cup Brazilian north trials as a brown belt (in a mixed brown and black belt division). He won his division at the Abu Dhabi World Cup with a victory over two-time world champion Braulio Estima, whilst still a brown belt, this earned him the nickname "black belt hunter". After being promoted to black belt, injury sidelined him throughout most of 2010. He returned in 2011 winning his division and the absolute at the Pan American Championships also winning double gold at the Abu Dhabi World Cup and the IBJJF World Championships, facing Bernardo Faria in five out of the six finals. Vieira competed at the 2011 ADCC Submission Wrestling World Championship where he defeated Joseph Lee Blaize and Antonio Peinado but lost to Dean Lister, in the semi-finals (by heel hook).

In 2012 after winning double gold at the European Championships and the World Cup, he suffered a defeat to Marcus Almeida in the absolute quarter-finals of the IBJJF World Championship, Vieira won his weight class for a second time after defeating Xande Ribeiro. In 2013 he competed at the Copa Podio in Brazil, where he won his weight division and the absolute. He then competed at the Abu Dhabi World Cup, where he won his weight division but came second in the absolute after losing to Marcus Almeida.

At the 2013 IBJJF World Championship, Vieira retained his title in the −94 kg weight class but lost to Almeida in the final of the absolute. In 2014 in an effort to defeat Marcus Almeida Vieira put on more weight and moved up to the −100 kg weight class, at the 2014 Abu Dhabi World Cup he won his weight class defeating Luiz Panza in the final, but again was defeated by Marcus Almeida in the absolute final.

On December 11, 2020, Vieira returned to grappling competition to headline a Who's Number One event against Kaynan Duarte. Vieira was submitted with a rear-naked choke at 2:28.

Grappling style
Vieira's Jiu-Jitsu style displays a very diverse set of skills, allied with a fast pace guard passing style, great cardio and huge physical prowess, making him the most dominant heavyweight in Jiu-Jitsu's recent years by completely dominating most of his fights. His recurrent matches with Marcus Almeida are among Jiu-Jitsu's most famous rivalries.

Mixed martial arts career

Early career
Vieira made his professional debut, as a light heavyweight, against Daniyar Zarylbekov at Arzalet Fighting Globe Championship 1 on February 10, 2017. He won the fight by a first-round rear-naked choke submission.

Vieira was scheduled to face Fagner Rakchal at Shooto Brazil 74 on August 27, 2017. He won the fight by a third-round submission.

Absolute Championship Berkut
Vieria made his ACB and middleweight debuts against Alexander Neufang at ACB 82 on March 9, 2018. Vieria won the fight by a first-round technical knockout.

Vieria made his second appearance with the promotion against Jacob Holyman-Tague at ACB 88 on June 16, 2018. He won the fight by a first-round submission.

Vieria was scheduled to face Vitaliy Nemchinov at ACA 96 on June 8, 2019. Vieria won the fight by a first-round submission.

Ultimate Fighting Championship 
Vieira was signed by UFC in June 2019.

Vieira made his debut at UFC, facing Oskar Piechota, at UFC on ESPN+ 14 on August 10, 2019. He won the fight via an arm-triangle submission in round two.

Vieira faced Saparbek Safarov on March 7, 2020 at UFC 248. He again won the fight via an arm-triangle submission in the first round.

Vieira was scheduled to face Markus Perez on October 11, 2020 at UFC Fight Night 179. However, on September 21, Vieira pulled out due to rib injury that was sustained in training, forcing him to rest and not be able to prepare for the fight.

Vieira was scheduled to face Anthony Hernandez on January 16, 2021 at UFC on ABC 1. However, Hernandez pulled out due to a positive COVID-19 test and they were rescheduled for UFC 258 on February 13, 2021. After a competitive first round Vieira became fatigued and was submitted via guillotine choke in round two. After the loss, Vieira vowed to fix his cardio issues.

Vieira faced Dustin Stoltzfus on July 17, 2021 at UFC on ESPN 26. He won the fight via rear-naked choke submission in round three. This win earned him the Performance of the Night award. Shortly after the fight, Vieira began working with Mano Santana, Lyoto Machida's Karate coach, to improve his striking.

Vieira was scheduled to face Wellington Turman on January 22, 2022 at UFC 270. However after Vieira was forced to withdraw due to medical reasons, the bout was cancelled. It was revealed after his withdrawal that Vieira had to undergo a cerebral angiography to determine if he would be able to continue fighting professionally, and he was cleared to continue.

Vieira faced Chris Curtis on June 25, 2022 at UFC on ESPN 38. He lost the fight via unanimous decision.

Vieira was scheduled to face Cody Brundage on November 19, 2022 at UFC Fight Night 215. However, Vieira pull out from the event due to undisclosed reason and the bout was scrapped.

The match between Vieiraand Cody Brundage is expected to take place at UFC Fight Night 223 on on April 29, 2023.

Championships and accomplishments

Mixed martial arts
Ultimate Fighting Championship
 Performance of the Night (One Time) vs.

Grappling

 IBJJF
IBJJF World Champion (weight and absolute weight classes) (2014/2013/2012/2011).
IBJJF Pans Champion (weight and absolute weight classes) Champion (2011)
IBJJF European Open Champion (weight and absolute weight classes) (2012)
IBJJF World Championship Runner-up (absolute weight class) (2014/2013/2012)
ADCC
ADCC Champion (2015)
Copa Pódio
Copa Pódio Champion (2014/2013)
IBJJF Europea
IBJJF European Open Champion (weight and absolute weight classes)(2012)
UAEJJF Abu Dhabi
UAEJJF Abu Dhabi World Pro Champion (absolute weight class)(2014)
UAEJJF Abu Dhabi World Pro Champion (weight and absolute weight classes)(2012/2011)
CBJJ Brazilian
CBJJ Brazilian Champion (weight and absolute weight classes)(2008 purple belt)
CBJJ Brazilian Champion (weight and absolute weight classes) ( 2007 blue belt)

Mixed martial arts record

|-
|Loss
|align=center|8–2
|Chris Curtis
|Decision (unanimous)
|UFC on ESPN: Tsarukyan vs. Gamrot
|
|align=center|3
|align=center|5:00
|Las Vegas, Nevada, United States
|
|-
|Win
|align=center|8–1
|Dustin Stoltzfus
|Submission (rear-naked choke)
|UFC on ESPN: Makhachev vs. Moisés
|
|align=center|3
|align=center|1:54
|Las Vegas, Nevada, United States
|
|-
|Loss
|align=center|7–1
|Anthony Hernandez
|Submission (guillotine choke)
|UFC 258 
|
|align=center|2		
|align=center|1:53
|Las Vegas, Nevada, United States
|
|-
|Win
|align=center|7–0
|Saparbek Safarov
|Submission (arm-triangle choke)
|UFC 248
|
|align=center|1
|align=center|2:58
|Las Vegas, Nevada, United States
|
|-
|Win
|align=center|6–0
|Oskar Piechota
|Submission (arm-triangle choke)
|UFC Fight Night: Shevchenko vs. Carmouche 2 
|
|align=center|2
|align=center|4:26
|Montevideo, Uruguay
|
|-
|Win
|align=center|5–0
|Vitaliy Nemchinov
|Submission (rear-naked choke)
|ACA 96
|
|align=center|1
|align=center|2:01
|Łódź, Poland
|  
|-
|Win
|align=center|4–0
|Jacob Holyman-Tague
|Submission (rear-naked choke)
|ACB 88
|
|align=center|1
|align=center|3:51
|Brisbane, Australia
|
|-
|Win
|align=center|3–0
|Alexander Neufang
|TKO (punches)
|ACB 82
|
|align=center|1
|align=center|3:42
|São Paulo, Brazil
|
|-
|Win
|align=center|2–0
|Fagner Rakchal
|Submission (arm-triangle choke)
|Shooto Brazil 74
|
|align=center|3
|align=center|4:47
|Rio de Janeiro, Brazil
|
|-
| Win
|align=center|1–0
|Daniyar Zarylbekov
|Submission (rear-naked choke)
|Arzalet Fighting Globe Championship 1
|
|align=center|1
|align=center|2:27
|São Paulo, Brazil
|
|-

Grappling record

See also
 List of current UFC fighters
 List of male mixed martial artists

References 

Brazilian male mixed martial artists
Brazilian practitioners of Brazilian jiu-jitsu
People awarded a black belt in Brazilian jiu-jitsu
Living people
1989 births
Sportspeople from Rio de Janeiro (city)
Middleweight mixed martial artists
Mixed martial artists utilizing Brazilian jiu-jitsu
Ultimate Fighting Championship male fighters
Brazilian jiu-jitsu practitioners who have competed in MMA (men)